Dog Hollow is a valley in Pope County, Illinois, in the United States. 

Legend has it the hollow was so named on account of two settlers being chased there by a headless dog.

References

Landforms of Pope County, Illinois
Valleys of Illinois